Riverside South-Findlay Creek Ward or Ward 22 is a city ward located in Ottawa, Ontario. Situated in the south end of the city, the ward includes the communities of Riverside South and Findlay Creek in the former city of Gloucester.

History
 
The ward  was created in 2006 from parts of Bell-South Nepean and Gloucester-Southgate Wards due to the rapid growth in both communities. It was known as Gloucester-South Nepean Ward until 2022. During this time, the ward also consisted of the neighbourhoods of Chapman Mills, Stonebridge and Davidson Heights in Barrhaven. Stonebridge was transferred to Barrhaven West Ward, while Chapman Mills and Davidson Heights were transferred to the new Barrhaven East Ward in 2022.

City councillors
Steve Desroches (2006-2014)
Michael Qaqish (2014-2018)
Carol Anne Meehan (2018–2022)
Steve Desroches (2022–present)

Election results

2006 Ottawa municipal election

2010 Ottawa municipal election

2014 Ottawa municipal election

2018 Ottawa municipal election

2022 Ottawa municipal election

References

External links
 Map of Gloucester-South Nepean Ward

Ottawa wards